Norman Kay may refer to:
Norman Kay (bridge) (1927–2002), American bridge player
Norman Kay (composer) (1929–2001), British composer
Norman Kaye (1927–2007), Australian actor and musician